Salamanperä Strict Nature Reserve (Salamanperän luonnonpuisto) is home to Wolverine and Finnish Forest Reindeer (R. tarandus fennicus), and it is said that wolves can be heard while in the nature reserve. It has a trail, but the distance of the trail is unknown as of now. This nature reserve is connected to Salamajärvi National Park and is a strict nature reserve. It is located in the Central Finland region of Finland.

References

Strict nature reserves of Finland
Geography of Central Finland
Kivijärvi